David Reed Bromstad (born August 17, 1973) is an American designer and television personality. In 2006, he became the winner of the debut season of HGTV Design Star. He has hosted a number of HGTV shows, including Color Splash, Beach Flip and My Lottery Dream Home.

Early life and education
Bromstad was born the youngest of four children to Diane Marlys Bromstad (née Krueger) and Richard Harold David Bromstad in Cokato, Minnesota. His mother is of Swedish and German descent, and his father is of Norwegian descent. He has three older siblings, Dean Richard Bromstad, Dynelle Renee Bromstad, and Dyonne Rachael Bromstad. He was always interested in art and design, and while attending Wayzata High School made a decision to pursue a career as a Disney animator. He attended the Ringling College of Art and Design in Sarasota, Florida, a school known as a starting point for careers with Disney. After graduating, he worked as a Disney illustrator.

Career
After being placed on leave as a Disney illustrator, he started his own company, Bromstad Studio. At the urging of a friend, Bromstad moved to Miami Beach and tried out for HGTV's Design Star, a reality show competition to pick a host for a new show on the HGTV cable network. On Design Star, Bromstad competed against nine other potential designers, winning the grand prize – a car, and the chance to host his own show on HGTV.

Bromstad was a guest on the second season of HGTV Design Star, appearing as a guest-judge in the first episode and as moral support to the finalists in "Challenge 7: Island Dreams." He was a mentor from Season 6, and host from Season 7.

He hosted Color Splash on HGTV from 2007 to 2012.

In 2012, he hosted Design Star All-Stars. He appeared on HGTV's Design at Your Door and was a competitor in the second season of Rock the Block, partnered with designer Tiffany Brooks. He has also appeared on HGTV'd, HGTV Showdown and Bang for Your Buck.

In 2015, Bromstad began hosting My Lottery Dream Home.

Personal life 
Bromstad is openly gay.

He owns a home in Orlando, Florida, which was featured on My Lottery Dream Home: David's Dream Home.

He has a "tattoo addiction" and favors designs that speak to his love of family, color, gay pride and Disney.

He was the first HGTV personality to be named to Out magazine's Out100 list of prominent LGBTQ people.

Filmography
Brother vs. Brother (2011–2017) – Celebrity judge during Seasons 3 and 4
Extreme Makeover: Home Edition (2020) - Guest on Season 1, Episode 3

References

External links
HGTV page for Color Splash with David Bromstad
HGTV: David Bromstad

1973 births
Living people
American interior designers
People from Cokato, Minnesota
Gay entertainers
LGBT people from Minnesota
Ringling College of Art and Design alumni
21st-century American LGBT people
American people of German descent
American people of Norwegian descent
American people of Swedish descent